The Final Call is a 2019 Indian web television thriller series based on 2015 novel I Will Go with You by Priya Kumar. Directed by Vijay Lalwani, it centres around the passengers of a flight from Mumbai to Sydney whose lives are endangered after the captain decides to commit suicide on board. Starring Arjun Rampal, Neeraj Kabi, Sakshi Tanwar, Harshad Arora‚ Anupriya Goenka, Javed Jaffrey, Paula McGlynn, Anshuman Malhotra and Vipin Sharma, The Final Call premiered on the online streaming platform ZEE5 on 22 February 2019. In a Press meet author Priya Kumar stated that she is also writing the season 2 of The Final Call.

Cast
 Arjun Rampal as Captain Karan Sachdev, a pilot who was a Wing commander in the Indian Air Force.
 Neeraj Kabi as V. Krishnamurthi
 Harshad Arora as Abhimanyu Sahai
 Javed Jaffrey as Siddharth Singhaniya
 Anupriya Goenka as Parineeta "Pari"
 Sakshi Tanwar as ATC Kiran Mirza
 Vipin Sharma as ATS Chief Kale
 Meenal Kapoor as Editor in chief Shalini
 Paula McGlynn as Sarah Parker
 Anshuman Malhotra as Dhruv Sehgal
 Vineet Sharma as Jaikrit Tyagi
Sulabha Arya as Dhruv's grandmother 
 Lydia Backhouse as Giselle
Ivan Sylvester Rodrigues as Thakur

Filming
The series was filmed in Kashmir, Kochi, Thailand and London. Some portions of the show were shot in London on the same set of a plane where the 2016 film Sully was shot. Rampal took several flight simulation classes for the role. It was earlier titled Row No. 26.

Episodes

References

External links
The Final Call on ZEE5

2019 Indian television series debuts
Hindi-language television shows
Television shows based on Indian novels
Aviation television series
Indian drama television series
Indian Armed Forces in fiction
Indian thriller television series
Thriller web series
ZEE5 original programming
Indian drama web series